Panupong Wongsa is a Thai retired professional footballer who played as a centre-back. He won the Thai Premier League in 2008, 2010, 2012 and current assistant manager of Thai League 1 club Bangkok United.

Club career

Panupong began his career with his hometown club, Chiangmai F.C. From 2002 to 2003 he played in the youth section of the club, in 2004, he joined the senior team. In 2005, he moved to Royal Thai Police F.C. and completed for this club until 2007 a total of 60 games. For the 2008 season he moved to PEA. At his new club, he could help to win the first championship (Thai Premier League) in club history. With the club he was in 2009 in the qualifying round of the 2009 AFC Champions League. Opponents was the Singapore Armed Forces F.C. After a 1-4 in extra time, he left with his club. But as to waste the skills of the club was allowed to participate in the 2009 AFC Cup and thus he gained his first experience in a Continental Vereinswettebwerb. End of the 2009 season, he was obliged by the new champion Muangthong United. Even with this club he could participate in the qualifying round of the AFC Champions League. After the club was able to SHB Đà Nẵng F.C. 3-0 defeat in the first round, they met in the second round of the championship in Singapore. This was no less than the Singapore Armed Forces. Even in his second attempt, he managed not to take the hurdle. For him personally, tragically, the game had to be in the penalty shoot-determination. Panupong here was the second shooter of his team. His penalty shot was very poor and could be parried by the opposing end man.

Panupong officially announced his retirement from professional football on 25 November 2017 after the match 2017 Thai FA Cup Final.

International career

For the Thailand national football team, he was so far in the U-23 squad and took part in the qualification for the Olympic Games in 2000. In the same year he won the gold medal with a choice at the Summer Universiade in 2007. A year later – in 2008 – they were among the cadres of ASEAN Football Championship. He became captain of the national team in 2012, and played an important role in the 2012 AFF Suzuki Cup.

International

Honours

Clubs
PEA 
 Thai Premier League (1): 2008

Muangthong United
 Thai Premier League (1): 2010, 2012

Individual
 ASEAN Football Federation Best XI: 2013

References

External links
 Panupong Wongsa profile at Bangkok United website
 

1983 births
Living people
Panupong Wongsa
Panupong Wongsa
Association football central defenders
Panupong Wongsa
Panupong Wongsa
Panupong Wongsa
Panupong Wongsa
Panupong Wongsa
Panupong Wongsa
Panupong Wongsa
Panupong Wongsa
Footballers at the 2010 Asian Games
Panupong Wongsa